

B
Babaj i Bokës 
Bajgorë Bajgora
Bërkova
Binqë/Binqe or Binaq or Bincë/Bince or Binçe/Bince
 Blas, Kosovo
Bllacë
Bogë
Boletin
Brezovica, Kosovo
Brod (Prizren)
Bublje
Budrik

C
Cerrcë

D
Deçan
Desivojca
Deqan
Dragash
Dërsnik

F
Fushë Kosovë

G
Gjakovë
Drenas
Gjilan
Gorazhdec
Gremë

I
Istog

J
 Qafëshqipe or Glloboçicë
 Jarinjë
Junik

K
Kabash
Kaçandoll
Kaçanik
Keçekollë
Kamenicë, Korçë
Kamicë-Flakë
Klinë
Kllokot
Koliq
Koretishtë
Korisha
Kuqishtë

L
Llapllasellë
Leposaviq
Lipjan

M
Malishevë
Mamushë
Mitrovicë

O
Obiliq
Opojë

P
Pakashticë
Partesh
Pejë
Podujevë or Besiana
Poljane, Istok
Pozharajë
Prapashticë
Prilep, Kosovo
Përlepnicë
Prishtinë
Prizren

R
Rahovec
Ranilug
Reçak

S
Sllakoc
Skenderaj
Sredskë
Stanovci
Studençan
Suhareka or Therandë, Theranda is an old Roman name for Prizren
Sfeçël

T
 Tuçep

F
Ferizaj

V
Velekinca
Hoçë e Madhe
Viti
Vranidoll
Vushtrri

Z
Zubin Potok
Zupç
Zuzaku
Zveçan

Č
Çagllavica

Đ
 Hani i Elezit

S
Shtime
Shtërpc

Ž
Zallç

See also 
 Administrative divisions of Kosovo
 Districts of Kosovo
 Municipalities of Kosovo
 List of cities in Kosovo

Populated places in Kosovo
Places
KOsovo
Kosovo